In 1758, in the 10th edition of Systema Naturae, the Swedish scientist and taxonomist Carl Linnaeus described the class "Vermes" as:
Animals of slow motion, soft substance, able to increase their bulk and restore parts which have been destroyed, extremely tenacious of life, and the inhabitants of moist places. Many of them are without a distinct head, and most of them without feet. They are principally distinguished by their tentacles (or feelers). By the Ancients they were not improperly called imperfect animals, as being destitute of ears, nose, head, eyes and legs; and are therefore totally distinct from Insects.

Linnaean Characteristics 
Heart: 1 auricle, 0 ventricles. Cold, pus-like blood.
Spiracles: obscure
Jaw: various
Penis: frequently hermaphrodites
Organs of Sense: tentacles (generally), eyes, no brain, no ears, no nostrils
Covering: calcareous or none, except spines
Supports: no feet, no fins. Crawls in moist places & are mute

The class Vermes, as Linnaeus conceived it, was a rather diverse and mismatched grouping of animals; basically it served as a wastebasket taxon for any invertebrate species that was not an arthropod. With the advent of the scientific understanding of evolution, it became clear that many of the animals in these groups were not in fact closely related, and so the class Vermes was dropped for several (at least 30) phyla.

Intestina 
Gordius (horsehair worms)

Gordius aquaticus 
Gordius argillaceus
Gordius medinensis – Dracunculus medinensis 

Furia
Furia infernalis – Despite the many accounts of this purported animal by respected authorities, including Daniel Solander and Linnaeus himself, it is now accepted that no such animal exists.

Lumbricus (earthworms)
Lumbricus terrestris – common earthworm
Lumbricus marinus – lugworm

Ascaris (giant intestinal roundworms)
Ascaris vermicularis – pinworm
Ascaris lumbricoides – giant roundworm

Fasciola (liver flukes)
Fasciola hepatica – sheep liver fluke
Fasciola intestinalis

Hirudo (leeches)
Hirudo sanguisuga – Haemopis sanguisuga, horse leech
Hirudo medicinalis – Hirudo medicinalis, European medicinal leech
Hirudo octoculata - Erpobdella octoculata 
Hirudo stagnalis - Helobdella stagnalis 
Hirudo complanata - Glossiphonia complanata 
Hirudo indica
Hirudo geometra- Piscicola geometra 
Hirudo muricata - Pontobdella muricata 

Myxine (hagfishes)
Myxine glutinosa – Atlantic hagfish

Teredo (shipworms)
Teredo lapidaria
Teredo navalis – naval shipworm

Mollusca 

Limax (terrestrial slugs)
Limax ater – Arion ater, the Black Slug
Limax rufus – Arion rufus, the Red Slug
Limax maximus – the Leopard Slug
Limax agrestis – now Deroceras agreste
Limax flavus –  now Limacus flavus, the Yellow Slug

Doris (dorid nudibranchs)
Doris verrucosa – warty dorid

Tethys (tethydid sea slugs)
Tethys limacina
Tethys leporina – Tethys fimbria

Nereis (polychaete worms)
Nereis lacustris – Stylaria lacustris
Nereis caerulea
Nereis gigantea
Nereis pelagica
Nereis noctiluca

Aphrodita (Sea mice)
Aphrodita squamata
Aphrodita aculeata

Lernaea (anchor worms)
Lernaea cyprinacea 
Lernaea asellina – Lernentoma asellina 
Lernaea salmonea – Salmincola salmoneus 

Priapus (priapulid worms & anemones)
Priapus equinus – Beadlet anemone
Priapus humanus – Priapulus caudatus

Scyllaea (scyllaeid sea slugs)
Scyllaea pelagica – Sargassum nudibranch

Holothuria (salps & Man o' Wars)
Holothuria physalis – Portuguese Man o' War
Holothuria thalia, Holothuria caudata, & Holothuria denudata – Cyclosalpa pinnata

Triton (triton snails)
Triton littoreus

Sepia (octopuses, squid, & cuttlefish)
Sepia octopodia – Eledone cirrhosa, the Horned Octopus 
Sepia officinalis – Sepia officinalis, the Common Cuttlefish
Sepia media
Sepia loligo - Loligo vulgaris, the Common Squid 
Sepia sepiola - Sepiola rondeleti, the Dwarf Bobtail 

Medusa (jellyfish)
Medusa porpita - Porpita porpita
Medusa cruciata
Medusa aequorea
Medusa aurita – Aurelia aurita, the Moon Jellyfish
Medusa capillata – Cyanea capillata, the Lion's Mane Jellyfish
Medusa pilearis
Medusa marsupialis - Carybdea marsupialis
Medusa pelagica
Medusa brachiata
Medusa beroe
Medusa velella - Velella velella

Asterias (starfish) 
Asterias luna - Anseropoda rosacea
Asterias rubens – Asterias rubens, the Common Starfish
Asterias glacialis - Marthasterias glacialis
Asterias reticulata - Oreaster reticulatus, the Red Cushion Sea Star
Asterias nodosa – Protoreaster nodosus, the Horned Sea Star
Asterias aranciaca - Astropecten aranciacus
Asterias equestris - Hippasteria phrygiana
Asterias laevigata – Linckia laevigata, the Blue Star
Asterias planci – Acanthaster planci, the Crown-of-thorns Starfish
Asterias ophiura - Ophiura ophiura, the Brittle-Star
Asterias pectinata - Comatula pectinata
Asterias multiradiata - Capillaster multiradiata
Asterias Caput medusae - Gorgonocephalus caputmedusae

Echinus (sea urchins & sand dollars)
Echinus esculentus – Echinus esculentus, the Edible Sea Urchin
Echinus globulus - Mespilia globulus
Echinus sphaeroides
Echinus gratilla – Tripneustes gratilla, the Collector Urchin
Echinus lixula – Arbacia lixula, the Black Sea Urchin
Echinus saxatilis
Echinus diadema – Echinothrix diadema, the Diadema Urchin
Echinus cidaris – Cidaris cidaris
Echinus mamillatus – Heterocentrotus mammillatus, the Slate Pencil Urchin
Echinus lucunter - Echinometra lucunter
Echinus atratus - Colobocentrotus atratus
Echinus spatagus - Metalia spatagus
Echinus lacunosus - Schizaster lacunosus
Echinus rosaceus – Clypeaster rosaceus
Echinus reticulatus - Clypeaster reticulatus
Echinus placenta - Arachnoides placenta
Echinus orbiculus - Hemiheliopsis fonti

Testacea 
Chiton (chitons)

Chiton hispidus
Chiton tuberculatus – West Indian green chiton
Chiton aculeatus
Chiton punctatus

Lepas (barnacles)
Lepas balanus – Balanus balanus 
Lepas tintinnabulum – Megabalanus tintinnabulum 
Lepas testudinaria – Chelonibia testudinaria 
Lepas mitella – Capitulum mitella 
Lepas anatifera 

Pholas (piddocks & angelwings)
Pholas dactylus – Pholas dactylus
Pholas costatus
Pholas striatus
Pholas candidus – Barnea candida
Pholas pusillus

Mya (soft-shell clams)
Mya crispata
Mya truncata – truncate softshell
Mya arenaria – common softshell
Mya lutraria
Mya pictorum
Mya margaritifera
Mya perna

Mya vulsella

Solen (razor clams)
Solen vagina
Solen siliqua – Pod razor
Solen ensis
Solen legumen
Solen cultellus
Solen radiatus
Solen strigilatus
Solen anatinus
Solen bullatus
Solen inaequivalvis

Tellina (tellins)
Tellina gargadia
Tellina linguafelis
Tellina virgata
Tellina gari
Tellina fragilis – Gastrana fragilis
Tellina albida
Tellina foliacea
Tellina planata
Tellina laevigata – smooth tellin
Tellina radiata – sunrise tellin
Tellina rostrata
Tellina trifasciata
Tellina incarnata
Tellina donacina – Donax tellin
Tellina balaustina
Tellina remies
Tellina scobinata
Tellina lactea
Tellina carnaria
Tellina bimaculata
Tellina balthica – Baltic tellin
Tellina pisiformis
Tellina divaricata
Tellina digitaria
Tellina cornea

Cardium (cockles)
Cardium costatum
Cardium cardissa
Cardium hemicardium
Cardium medium
Cardium muricatum – Acanthocardia aculeata
Cardium echinatum – Acanthocardia echinata
Cardium ciliare
Cardium tuberculatum – Acanthocardia tuberculata
Cardium isocardia
Cardium fragum
Cardium unedo
Cardium muricatum
Cardium magnum
Cardium flavum
Cardium laevigatum
Cardium serratum
Cardium triste
Cardium corallinum
Cardium solidum
Cardium edule – common cockle
Cardium rusticum
Cardium pectinatum
Cardium stultorum
Cardium virgineum
Cardium humanum

Donax (wedge shells)

Donax pubescens
Donax rugosa
Donax trunculus
Donax denticulata
Donax cuneata
Donax scripta
Donax muricata
Donax irus

Venus (Venus clams)
Venus dione
Venus marica
Venus dysera
Venus verrucosa – warty venus
Venus casina
Venus gallina – Chamelea gallina
Venus petulca
Venus erycina
Venus mercenaria – hard clam
Venus chione
Venus maculata
Venus meretrix
Venus scortum
Venus laeta
Venus castrensis
Venus phryne
Venus meroë
Venus deflorata
Venus fimbriata
Venus reticulata
Venus squamosa
Venus tigerina
Venus prostrata
Venus pensylvanica
Venus incrustata
Venus punctata
Venus exoleta
Venus orbicularis
Venus ziczac
Venus pectinata
Venus scripta
Venus edentula
Venus lupinus
Venus literata
Venus rotundata
Venus decussata

Spondylus (thorny oysters)
Spondylus gaederopus
Spondylus regius

Chama (jewel box shells)
Chama lazarus
Chama gigas
Chama hippopus
Chama antiquata
Chama semiorbiculata
Chama calyculata
Chama cordata
Chama oblonga
Chama gryphoides
Chama bicornis

Arca (ark clams)
Arca tortuosa
Arca noae
Arca barbata – Barbatia barbata
Arca pella
Arca lactea – Striarca lactea
Arca antiquata
Arca senilis
Arca granosa
Arca decussata
Arca pallens
Arca undata
Arca pectunculus
Arca glycymeris
Arca nummaria
Arca nucleus

Ostrea (true oysters)
Ostrea maxima
Ostrea jacobaea
Ostrea ziczac
Ostrea striatula
Ostrea minuta
Ostrea pleuronectes
Ostrea obliterata
Ostrea radula
Ostrea plica
Ostrea pallium
Ostrea nodosa
Ostrea pes felis
Ostrea pellucens
Ostrea sanguinea
Ostrea varia
Ostrea pusio
Ostrea glabra
Ostrea opercularis
Ostrea gibba
Ostrea flavicans
Ostrea fasciata
Ostrea lima
Ostrea isognomum
Ostrea malleus
Ostrea folium – Pycnodonta folium
Ostrea orbicularis
Ostrea edulis – edible oyster
Ostrea semiaurita
Ostrea ephippium

Anomia (saddle oysters)
Anomia craniolaris
Anomia pectinata
Anomia ephippium
Anomia cepa
Anomia electrica
Anomia squamula – prickly jingle
Anomia scobinata
Anomia aurita
Anomia retusa – Terebratulina retusa
Anomia gryphus
Anomia pecten
Anomia striatula
Anomia reticularis
Anomia plicatella
Anomia crispa
Anomia lacunosa
Anomia fareta
Anomia caput serpentis
Anomia terebratula
Anomia angulata
Anomia hysterita
Anomia biloba
Anomia placenta

Mytilus – (Mussels including marine and freshwater mussels)
Mytilus crista galli
Mytilus hyotis
Mytilus frons
Mytilus margaritiferus – freshwater pearl mussel
Mytilus unguis
Mytilus lithophagus
Mytilus bilocularis
Mytilus exustus
Mytilus barbatus
Mytilus edulis – blue mussel
Mytilus ungulatus
Mytilus modiolus
Mytilus cygneus – swan mussel (a freshwater mussel)
Mytilus anatinus – duck mussel (a freshwater mussel)
Mytilus viridis
Mytilus ruber
Mytilus hirundo

Pinna (pen shells)
Pinna rudis – rough penshell
Pinna nobilis
Pinna muricata
Pinna rotundata
Pinna saccata
Pinna digitiformis
Pinna lobata
Pinna pennacea

Argonauta (paper nautiluses)
Argonauta argo – greater argonaut
Argonauta cymbium

Nautilus (Nautiluses)
Nautilus pompilius – chambered nautilus
Nautilus crista
Nautilus calcar
Nautilus crispus
Nautilus beccarii
Nautilus umbilicatus
Nautilus spirula – Spirula spirula
Nautilus Semi-Lituus
Nautilus obliqvus
Nautilus raphanistrum
Nautilus raphanus
Nautilus granum
Nautilus radicula
Nautilus fascia
Nautilus sipunculus
Nautilus legumen
Nautilus orthocera

Conus (Cone Snails)
Conus marmoreus – marbled cone
Conus imperialis – imperial cone
Conus litteratus – lettered cone
Conus virgo
Conus capitaneus
Conus miles
Conus princeps
Conus ammiralis
Conus senator
Conus nobilis
Conus genuanus
Conus glaucus
Conus monachus – Conus achatinus
Conus minimus
Conus rusticus
Conus mercator
Conus betulinus
Conus figulinus
Conus ebraeus – black-and-white cone
Conus stercus muscarum – Conus stercusmuscarum
Conus varius
Conus spinosus
Conus clavus
Conus nussatella – Nussatella cone
Conus granulatus – Glory-of-the-Atlantic cone
Conus aurisiacus
Conus magus
Conus striatus – striated cone
Conus textile – cloth of gold cone
Conus aulicus
Conus spectrum
Conus bullatus – bubble cone
Conus tulipa
Conus geographus – geography cone
Conus terebellum – Terebellum terebellum

Cypraea (Cowries)
Cypraea mappa – map cowry
Cypraea arabica – Arabian cowry
Cypraea argus
Cypraea testudinaria – turtle cowry
Cypraea stercoraria
Cypraea carneola – Carnelian cowry
Cypraea zebra – measled cowry
Cypraea talpa – mole cowry
Cypraea amethystea
Cypraea lurida
Cypraea vanelli
Cypraea lota
Cypraea fragilis
Cypraea caput serpentis – serpent's-head cowry
Cypraea mauritiana – humpback cowry
Cypraea vitellus
Cypraea mus
Cypraea tigris – tiger cowry
Cypraea lynx
Cypraea isabella – Luria isabella
Cypraea onyx
Cypraea succincta
Cypraea ziczac
Cypraea hirundo
Cypraea asellus
Cypraea cribraria
Cypraea errones
Cypraea moneta – money cowry
Cypraea caurica
Cypraea annulus – gold ringer
Cypraea erosa – gnawed cowry
Cypraea helvola – honey cowry
Cypraea spurca
Cypraea stolida – stolid cowry
Cypraea ocellata
Cypraea flaveola
Cypraea poraria
Cypraea pediculus
Cypraea nucleus
Cypraea staphylaea – stippled cowry
Cypraea cicercula
Cypraea globulus

Bulla (bubble shells)
Bulla ovum
Bulla volva
Bulla spelta
Bulla verrucosa
Bulla gibbosa
Bulla naucum
Bulla hydatis
Bulla ampulla
Bulla lignaria
Bulla physis
Bulla amplustre
Bulla pallida
Bulla canaliculata
Bulla fontinalis
Bulla hypnorum
Bulla cypraea
Bulla tornatilis
Bulla achatin
Bulla Auris Midae
Bulla Auris Judae
Bulla solidula
Bulla livida
Bulla coffea

Voluta (volutes)
Voluta porphyria
Voluta oliva
Voluta ispidula
Voluta persicula
Voluta monilis
Voluta miliaria
Voluta faba
Voluta glabella
Voluta mercatoria
Voluta rustica
Voluta paupercula – Mitra paupercula
Voluta mendicaria
Voluta tringa
Voluta cornicula
Voluta caffra
Voluta sanguisuga
Voluta vulpecula
Voluta plicaria
Voluta pertusa
Voluta mitra episcopalis
Voluta mitra papalis
Voluta musica – music volute
Voluta vespertilio
Voluta ebraea – Hebrew volute
oluta aethiopica – Melo aethiopica
Voluta cymbium
Voluta olla

Buccinum (true whelks)
Buccinum olearium – Tonna galea
Buccinum galea
Buccinum perdix
Buccinum pomum – Malea pomum
Buccinum dolium
Buccinum echinophorum
Buccinum tuberosum
Buccinum plicatum
Buccinum cornutum
Buccinum rufum
Buccinum flammeum
Buccinum testiculus
Buccinum decussatum
Buccinum areola
Buccinum erinaceus
Buccinum glaucum
Buccinum vibex
Buccinum papillosum
Buccinum glans
Buccinum arcularia – Nassarius arcularia
Buccinum pullus – Nassa pulla
Buccinum gibbosulum
Buccinum mutabile
Buccinum neriteum
Buccinum harpa – Harpa harpa
Buccinum costatum – Harpa costata
Buccinum persicum – Purpura persica
Buccinum patulum
Buccinum lapillus – dog whelk
Buccinum smaragdulus – Leucozonia smaragdula
Buccinum spiratum
Buccinum glabratum
Buccinum virgineum
Buccinum praemorsum
Buccinum undosum – Cantharus undosus
Buccinum undatum – common whelk
Buccinum reticulatum
Buccinum scabriculum
Buccinum nitidulum
Buccinum laevigatum
Buccinum maculatum – Oxymeris maculata
Buccinum crenulatum
Buccinum hecticum – Impages hectica
Buccinum strigilatum – Hastula strigilata
Buccinum duplicatum – Duplicaria duplicata
Buccinum dimidiatum – Acus dimidiata
Buccinum murinum

Strombus (true conchs)
Strombus pes pelecani – pelican's foot
Strombus chiragra – Lambis chiragra
Strombus scorpius – Lambis scorpius
Strombus lambis – Lambis lambis
Strombus millepeda – Lambis millepeda
Strombus lentiginosus – silver conch
Strombus gallus – Aliger gallus
Strombus auris dianae – Strombus aurisdianae
Strombus pugilis – West Indian fighting conch
Strombus marginatus
Strombus luhuanus – strawberry conch
Strombus gibberulus – humpbacked conch
Strombus lucifer
Strombus gigas – Eustrombus gigas
Strombus latissimus
Strombus epidromis
Strombus canarium
Strombus vittatus
Strombus urceus
Strombus dentatus
Strombus ater
Strombus lividus

Murex (Murex Snails)
Murex haustellum – Haustellum haustellum
Murex tribulus
Murex cornutus – Bolinus cornutus
Murex brandaris – purple dye murex
Murex trunculus – banded dye murex
Murex ramosus – ramose murex
Murex scorpio – scorpion murex
Murex saxatilis
Murex erinaceus – European sting winkle
Murex rana – Bufonaria rana
Murex gyrinus – Gyrineum gyrinum
Murex lampas – Charonia lampas
Murex oleariú
Murex femorale – Cymatium femorale
Murex lotoriú – Lotoria lotoria
Murex pileare
Murex rubecula – Septa rubecula
Murex scrobilator – Bursa scrobilator
Murex reticularis – Distorsio reticularis
Murex pyrum – Ranularia pyrum
Murex anus – Distorsio anus
Murex ricinus
Murex capitellum
Murex turbinellus
Murex nodus
Murex hystrix
Murex mancinella – Purpura mancinella
Murex ceramicus
Murex hippocastanum – Thais virgata
Murex melongena
Murex scabriculus
Murex senticosus
Murex ficus – Ficus ficus
Murex rapa
Murex granum
Murex fusus
Murex babylonius
Murex colus – distaff spindle
Murex morio
Murex cochlidium
Murex canaliculatus
Murex aruanus – Australian trumpet
Murex perversus
Murex antiqvus
Murex despectus
Murex tritonis
Murex tulipa – Fasciolaria tulipa
Murex pusio
Murex corneus
Murex ligniarius – Fasciolaria lignaria
Murex trapezium – Pleuroploca trapezium
Murex syracusanus – Fusinus syracusanus
Murex craticulatus – Turrilatirus craticulatus
Murex scriptus
Murex aluco – Pseudovertagus aluco
Murex fuscatus
Murex radula
Murex asper – Rhinoclavis aspera
Murex granulatus

Trochus (top snails)
Trochus maculatus – maculated top shell
Trochus perspectivus
Trochus hybridus
Trochus cruciatus
Trochus pharaonius – strawberry top shell
Trochus magus
Trochus modulus
Trochus muricatus
Trochus scaber
Trochus varius – Gibbula varia
Trochus cinerarius
Trochus divaricatus
Trochus umbilicaris – Gibbula umbilicaris
Trochus vestiarius
Trochus labio
Trochus tuber
Trochus striatus
Trochus conulus – Calliostoma conulus
Trochus zizyphinus – Calliostoma zizyphinum
Trochus telescopium
Trochus dolabratus
Trochus perversus
Trochus punctatus
Trochus striatellus – Jujubinus striatus

Turbo (turban snails)
Turbo obtusatus – flat periwinkle
Turbo neritoides
Turbo littoreus
Turbo muricatus – Cenchritis muricatus
Turbo cimex
Turbo pullus
Turbo personatus
Turbo petholatus
Turbo cochlus
Turbo chrysostomus
Turbo tectum persicum
Turbo pagodus
Turbo calcar
Turbo marmoratus – great green turban
Turbo sarmaticus
Turbo olearius
Turbo pica – West Indian top shell
Turbo sanguineus – Homalopoma sanguineum
Turbo argyrostomus
Turbo margaritaceus
Turbo delphinus
Turbo distortus
Turbo scalaris
Turbo clathrus
Turbo crenatus
Turbo lacteus
Turbo striatulus
Turbo uva
Turbo corneus
Turbo reflexus
Turbo lincina
Turbo imbricatus
Turbo replicatus
Turbo acutangulus
Turbo duplicatus – Turritella duplicata
Turbo exoletus – Turritella exoleta
Turbo terebra – Turritella terebra
Turbo variegatus – Turritella variegata
Turbo ungulinus
Turbo annulatus – Pyrgula annulata
Turbo bidens – Papillifera bidens
Turbo perversus
Turbo muscorum – Pupilla muscorum
Turbo auriscalpium
Turbo politus

Helix (land snails)
Helix scarabaeus
Helix lapicida
Helix oculus capri
Helix albella
Helix striatula
Helix algira – Zonites algirus
Helix leucas
Helix planorbis
Helix complanata
Helix ringens
Helix carocolla
Helix cornu militare
Helix vortex
Helix scabra – Littoraria scabra
Helix gothica
Helix gualtierana
Helix cornea
Helix spirorbis
Helix contorta
Helix cornu arietis
Helix hispida
Helix ampullacea
Helix pomatia – Roman snail
Helix glauca
Helix citrina
Helix arbustorum
Helix ungulina
Helix itala
Helix hispana
Helix lutaria – Helix lutescens
Helix perversa
Helix janthina – common purple snail
Helix vivipara – Viviparus contectus a freshwater snail
Helix nemoralis – grove snail
Helix lucorum
Helix grisea
Helix haemastoma
Helix decollata – decollate snail
Helix pupa
Helix barbara
Helix amarula
Helix stagnalis – great pond snail
Helix fragilis
Helix putris
Helix limosa
Helix tentaculata – common bithynia
Helix auricularia – big-ear radix
Helix balthica
Helix neritoidea
Helix perspicua
Helix haliotoidea
Helix ambigua

Neritha (nerites)
Nerita canrena
Nerita glaucina
Nerita vitellus
Nerita albumé
Nerita mammilla
Nerita nodosa – Thais nodosa
Nerita corona
Nerita radula
Nerita cornea
Nerita fluviatilis
Nerita littoralis
Nerita lacustris
Nerita bidens
Nerita viridis
Nerita virginea
Nerita polita
Nerita peloronta – bleeding tooth
Nerita albicilla – blotched nerite
Nerita histrio
Nerita plicata
Nerita grossa
Nerita chamaeleon
Nerita undata
Nerita exuvia – snakeskin nerite

Haliotis (abalones)
Haliotis midae
Haliotis tuberculata – green ormer
Haliotis striata
Haliotis varia
Haliotis marmorata – virgin paua
Haliotis asinina – ass's ear abalone
Haliotis parva

Patella (true limpets & brachiopods)
Patella equestris
Patella neritoidea
Patella chinensis
Patella porcellana
Patella fornicata
Patella laciniosa – Siphonaria laciniosa
Patella saccharina
Patella barbara – Scutellastra barbara
Patella granularis – Scutellastra granularis
Patella granatina – Cymbula granatina
Patella vulgata – common limpet
Patella caerulea
Patella tuberculata
Patella ungarica
Patella mammillaris
Patella pectinata – striped false limpet
Patella lutea
Patella unguis – Lingula anatina
Patella lacustris
Patella pellucida – blue-rayed limpet
Patella testudinaria – Cellana testudinaria
Patella compressa – Cymbula compressa
Patella rustica
Patella fusca
Patella notata – Clypidina notata
Patella cruciata
Patella reticulata
Patella fissura – common slit limpet
Patella pustula
Patella graeca – Greek keyhole limpet
Patella nimbosa
Patella nubecula

Dentalium (tusk shells)
Dentalium elephantinum
Dentalium dentalis
Dentalium entalis – Antalis entalis
Dentalium minutum

Serpula (serpulid worms)
Serpula seminulum
Serpula planorbis
Serpula spirillum
Serpula spirorbis
Serpula triquetra – Pomatoceros triqueter
Serpula intricata
Serpula contortuplicata
Serpula glomerata – Petaloconchus glomeratus
Serpula lumbricalis – Petaloconchus adansoni
Serpula arenaria – Serpulorbis arenarius
Serpula anguina – Tenagodus anguinus
Serpula penis veneris
Serpula penicillus
Serpula ringens

Lithophyta 
Tubipora (organ pipe corals)

Tubipora musica – Organ pipe coral
Tubipora infundibuliformis
Tubipora verrucosa
Tubipora urceus
Tubipora serpens
Tubipora repens
Tubipora arenosa

Millepora (Fire corals)
Millepora cellulosa
Millepora lichenoides
Millepora damicornis
Millepora alcicornis
Millepora reticulata
Millepora lineata
Millepora compressa
Millepora muricata
Millepora eschara
Millepora crustacea

Madrepora (stone corals)
Madrepora acetabulum – Acetabularia acetabulum
Madrepora verrucaria
Madrepora turbinata
Madrepora fungites
Madrepora pileus
Madrepora maeandrites
Madrepora labyrinthiformis
Madrepora areolata
Madrepora punctata
Madrepora agaricites
Madrepora truncata
Madrepora stellaris
Madrepora polygama
Madrepora favosa
Madrepora astroites
Madrepora organum
Madrepora flexuosa
Madrepora turbinata
Madrepora fascicularis
Madrepora ananas
Madrepora pertusa
Madrepora ramea
Madrepora rubra
Madrepora oculata
Madrepora virginea

Zoophyta 
Isis (soft corals)
Isis hippuris
Isis dichotoma
Isis ocracea
Isis anastatica
Isis encrinus

Gorgonia (sea fans)
Gorgonia spiralis
Gorgonia ventalina – Common Sea Fan
Gorgonia flabellum – Venus Sea Fan
Gorgonia antipathes
Gorgonia ceratophyta
Gorgonia pinnata
Gorgonia aenea
Gorgonia placomus
Gorgonia abies

Alcyonium (soft corals)
Alcyonium arboreu
Alcyonium digitatu
Alcyonium bursa

Tubularia (Tubularia)
Tubularia indivisa – Tall Tubularia
Tubularia ramosa

Eschara (Bryozoa)
Eschara foliacea
Eschara fistulosa
Eschara fragilis
Eschara divaricata
Eschara verticillata

Corallina (coralline algae)
Corallina opuntia
Corallina officinalis
Corallina squamata
Corallina corniculata
Corallina barbata
Corallina fragilissima
Corallina rubens – Jania rubens
Corallina cristata
Corallina spermophoros
Corallina penicillus

Sertularia (Bryozoa)
Sertularia rosacea
Sertularia pumila
Sertularia operculata
Sertularia tamarisca
Sertularia abietina
Sertularia cupressina
Sertularia argentea
Sertularia avicularia
Sertularia rugosa
Sertularia halecina
Sertularia thuja
Sertularia eburnea – Crisia eburnea
Sertularia cornuta
Sertularia myriophyllum
Sertularia falcata
Sertularia pluma
Sertularia antennina
Sertularia verticillata
Sertularia volubilis
Sertularia cuscuta
Sertularia uva – Walkeria uva
Sertularia lendigera
Sertularia geniculata
Sertularia dichotoma
Sertularia spinosa
Sertularia pinnata
Sertularia polyzonias
Sertularia setacea
Sertularia stipulata
Sertularia pennaria
Sertularia lichenastrum
Sertularia cedrina
Sertularia purpurea
Sertularia flexuosa
Sertularia bursaria
Sertularia loricata
Sertularia fastigiata
Sertularia neritina – Bugula neritina
Sertularia scruposa
Sertularia reptans
Sertularia ciliata
Sertularia chelata
Sertularia anguina – Aetea anguina
Sertularia polypina

Hydra
Hydra polypus
Hydra campanulata
Hydra socialis
Hydra stentoria
Hydra pyraria
Hydra convallaria
Hydra crataegaria
Hydra opercularia
Hydra umbellaria
Hydra berberina
Hydra digitalis

Pennatula (sea pens)

Pennatula phosphorea
Pennatula filosa
Pennatula sagitta
Pennatula mirabilis

Taenia (tapeworms)
Taenia solium – pork tapeworm
Taenia vulgaris
Taenia lata
Taenia canina

Volvox
Volvox globator 
Volvox chaos - Chaos chaos

References

Systema Naturae
 Systema Naturae, Vermes
Worms (obsolete taxon)